George Griffin (born 1943) is an American experimental animator based in New York. Graduated with a degree in political science in Dartmouth, came to New York City and began working on commercial studios in 1967. He built his own camera and was inspired by the works of Robert Breer, Stan Vanderbeek and John Hubley; made his first film in 1969.

Films
His best known works are Head (1975), Viewmaster (1978),  Lineage (1979), It's An OK Life (1980), Flying Fur (1981) set to the music of cartoon composer Scott Bradley for the Tom and Jerry short Puttin On The Dog, Ko-Ko (1988) set to the music of Charlie Parker and  A Little Routine (1994).

A Little Routine is available as part of Animation Show of Shows.

Television
He was line producer for R.O. Blechman's The Soldier's Tale (1984), made commercials for Colossal Pictures and does commissioned works at his own studio called Metropolis Studios.

See also
Independent animation
Experimental film
Film essay

References

External links
 Homepage
 IMDB
 Vimeo

American experimental filmmakers
American animated film directors
Living people
1943 births
American animators